Beach is an unincorporated community on Lummi Island in Whatcom County, in the U.S. state of Washington.

History
A post office called Beach was established in 1882, and remained in operation until 1946. The community was named after Wade H. Beach, an early settler.

References

Unincorporated communities in Whatcom County, Washington
Unincorporated communities in Washington (state)